Megan Richter (born 29 December 2000) is a British Paralympic swimmer who competes in international level events. She has won a bronze medal for her backstroke in 2019 at the world championships. She has also competed in paratriathlon.

References

External links
 
 

2000 births
Living people
Sportspeople from Sheffield
Paralympic swimmers of Great Britain
Medalists at the World Para Swimming Championships
Medalists at the World Para Swimming European Championships